Rozki may refer to the following places:

Rożki, Lublin Voivodeship (east Poland)
Rożki, Masovian Voivodeship (east-central Poland)
Rożki, Świętokrzyskie Voivodeship (south-central Poland)
Różki, Pomeranian Voivodeship (north Poland)

See also
 Roszki, Gmina Krotoszyn, Krotoszyn County, Greater Poland Voivodeship, Poland; a village
 Roski (disambiguation)
 Russki (disambiguation)